The 2000 Waveney Council election took place on 4 May 2000 to elect members of Waveney District Council in Suffolk, England. One third of the council was up for election and the Labour Party stayed in overall control of the council.

After the election, the composition of the council was:
Labour 28
Conservative 13
Liberal Democrat 4
Independent 2
Others 1

Election result

Ward results

References

2000 English local elections
2000
20th century in Suffolk